Friedrich Nietzsche (1844–1900) developed his philosophy during the late 19th century. He owed the awakening of his philosophical interest to reading Arthur Schopenhauer's Die Welt als Wille und Vorstellung (The World as Will and Representation, 1819, revised 1844) and said that Schopenhauer was one of the few thinkers that he respected, dedicating to him his essay Schopenhauer als Erzieher (Schopenhauer as Educator), published in 1874 as one of his Untimely Meditations.

Since the dawn of the 20th century, the philosophy of Nietzsche has had great intellectual and political influence around the world. Nietzsche applied himself to such topics as morality, religion, epistemology, poetry, ontology, and social criticism. Because of Nietzsche's evocative style and his often outrageous claims, his philosophy generates passionate reactions running from love to disgust. Nietzsche noted in his autobiographical Ecce Homo that his philosophy developed and evolved over time, so interpreters have found it difficult to relate concepts central to one work to those central to another, for example, the thought of the eternal recurrence features heavily in Also sprach Zarathustra (Thus Spoke Zarathustra), but is almost entirely absent from his next book, Beyond Good and Evil. Added to this challenge is the fact that Nietzsche did not seem concerned to develop his thought into a system, even going so far as to disparage the attempt in Beyond Good and Evil.

Common themes in his thought can, however, be identified and discussed. His earliest work emphasized the opposition of Apollonian and Dionysian impulses in art, and the figure of Dionysus continued to play a role in his subsequent thought. Other major currents include the will to power, the claim that God is dead, the distinction between master and slave moralities, and radical perspectivism. Other concepts appear rarely, or are confined to one or two major works, yet are considered centerpieces of Nietzschean philosophy, such as the Übermensch and the thought of eternal recurrence. His later works involved a sustained attack on Christianity and Christian morality, and he seemed to be working toward what he called the transvaluation of all values (Umwertung aller Werte).  While Nietzsche is often associated in the public mind with fatalism and nihilism, Nietzsche himself viewed his project as the attempt to overcome the pessimism of Arthur Schopenhauer.

Nihilism and God is dead 

Nietzsche saw nihilism as the outcome of repeated frustrations in the search for the meaning of religion. He diagnosed nihilism as a latent presence within the very foundations of European culture and saw it as a necessary and approaching destiny.  The religious worldview had already suffered a number of challenges from contrary perspectives grounded in philosophical skepticism, and in modern science's evolutionary and heliocentric theory. Nietzsche saw this intellectual condition as a new challenge to European culture, which had extended itself beyond a sort of point-of-no-return. Nietzsche conceptualizes this with the famous statement "God is dead", which first appeared in his work in section 108 of The Gay Science, again in section 125 with the parable of "The Madman", and even more famously in Thus Spoke Zarathustra. The statement, typically placed in quotation marks, accentuated the crisis that Nietzsche argued that Western culture must face and transcend in the wake of the irreparable dissolution of its traditional foundations, moored largely in classical Greek philosophy and Christianity. In aphorisms 55 and 56 of Beyond Good and Evil, Nietzsche talks about the ladder of religious cruelty that suggests how Nihilism emerged from the intellectual conscience of Christianity. Nihilism is sacrificing the meaning "God" brings into our lives; in aphorism 56, Nietzsche explains how to emerge from the utter meaninglessness of life by reaffirming it through his idea of Eternal Return.

Christianity and morality 

In The Antichrist,  Nietzsche fights against the way in which Christianity has become an ideology set forth by institutions like churches, and how churches have failed to represent the life of Jesus. Nietzsche finds it important to distinguish between the religion of Christianity and the person of Jesus. Nietzsche attacked the Christian religion, as represented by churches and institutions, for what he called its "transvaluation" of healthy instinctive values. Transvaluation consists of the process by which one can view the meaning of a concept or ideology from a "higher" context. Nietzsche went beyond agnostic and atheistic thinkers of the Enlightenment, who simply regarded Christianity as untrue. He claimed that the Apostle Paul may have deliberately propagated Christianity as a subversive religion (a "psychological warfare weapon") within the Roman Empire as a form of covert revenge for the Roman destruction of Jerusalem and of the Second Temple in 71 AD during the Jewish War of 66–73 AD. Nietzsche contrasts the Christians with Jesus, whom he regarded as a unique individual, and argues he established his own moral evaluations. As such, Jesus represents a kind of step towards his ideation of the Übermensch.

Ultimately, however, Nietzsche claims that, unlike the Übermensch, who embraces life, Jesus denied reality in favor of his "kingdom of God". Jesus's refusal to defend himself, and subsequent death, logically followed from this total disengagement. Nietzsche goes further to analyze the history of Christianity, finding it has progressively distorted the teachings of Jesus more and more. He criticizes the early Christians for turning Jesus into a martyr and Jesus's life into the story of the redemption of mankind in order to dominate the masses, and finds the Apostles cowardly, vulgar, and resentful. He argues that successive generations further misunderstood the life of Jesus as the influence of Christianity grew.  Nietzsche also criticized Christianity for demonizing flourishing in life, and glorifying living an apathetic life.  By the 19th century, Nietzsche concludes, Christianity had become so worldly as to parody itself—a total inversion of a world view which was, in the beginning, nihilistic, thus implying the "death of God".

Master morality and slave morality 

Nietzsche argued that two types of morality existed: a master morality that springs actively from the "nobleman", and a slave morality that develops reactively within the weak man. These two moralities do not present simple inversions of one another. They form two different value systems: master morality fits actions into a scale of "good" or "bad" consequences, whereas slave morality fits actions into a scale of "good" or "evil" intentions. Surprisingly he disdained both, though the first clearly less than the second.

The Wille zur Macht and the thought of eternal recurrence 

Since Martin Heidegger at least, the concepts of the will to power (Wille zur Macht), of Übermensch and of the thought of Eternal Recurrence have been inextricably linked. According to Heidegger's interpretation, one can not be thought without the others. During Nazi Germany, Alfred Baeumler attempted to separate the concepts, claiming that the Eternal Recurrence was only an "existential experience" that, if taken seriously, would endanger the possibility of a "will to power"— deliberately misinterpreted, by the Nazis, as a "will for domination". Baeumler attempted to interpret the "will to power" along Social Darwinist lines, an interpretation refuted by Heidegger in his 1930s courses on Nietzsche.

The term Wille zur Macht first appeared in the posthumous fragment 23 [63] of 1876–1877. While Heidegger's reading has become predominant among commentators, some have criticized it: Mazzino Montinari by declaring that it was forging the figure of a "macroscopical Nietzsche", alien to all of his nuances.

The will to power

"Will to power" (Wille zur Macht) is the name of a concept created by Nietzsche; the title of a projected book which he finally decided not to write; and the title of a book compiled from his notebooks and published posthumously and under suspicious circumstances by his sister and Peter Gast.

The work consists of four separate books, entitled "European Nihilism", "Critique of the Highest Values Hitherto", "Principles of a New Evaluation", and "Discipline and Breeding". Within these books there are some 1067 small sections, usually the shape of a circle, and sometimes just a key phrase—such as his opening comments in the 1st monstrosity of the preface: "Of what is great one must either be silent or speak with greatness. With greatness—that means cynically and with innocence."

Despite Elisabeth Förster-Nietzsche's falsifications (highlighted in 1937 by Georges Bataille and proved in the 1960s by the complete edition of Nietzsche's posthumous fragments by Mazzino Montinari and Giorgio Colli), his notes, even in the form given by his sister, remain a key insight into the philosophy of Nietzsche, and his unfinished transvaluation of all values. An English edition of Montinari & Colli's work is forthcoming (it has existed for decades in Italian, German and French).

The “Will to power” also contains the provisional outline to Nietzsche’s aesthetics as a whole. This has been described as his attempt at a physiology of art where he established the concept of artistic rapture (Rausch). This phenomenon, which is considered a countermovement to nihilism, is for the Nietzsche the force that brings forth not only the form but the fundamental condition for the enhancement of life.

Übermensch 

Throughout his works, Nietzsche writes about possible great human beings or "higher types" who serve as an example of people who would follow his philosophical ideas. These ideal human beings Nietzsche calls by terms such as "the philosopher of the future", "the free spirit", "the tragic artist" and "the Übermensch". They are often described by Nietzsche as being highly creative, courageous, powerful and extremely rare individuals. He compares such individuals with certain historical figures which have been very rare and often have not been considered geniuses, such as Napoleon, Goethe and Beethoven. His main example of a genius exemplary culture is Archaic Greece.

While interpretations of Nietzsche's overman vary wildly, here are a few of his quotes from Thus Spoke Zarathustra:

I teach you the Übermensch.  Man is something that shall be overcome.  What have you done to overcome him? ... All beings so far have created something beyond themselves; and do you want to be the ebb of this great flood, and even go back to the beasts rather than overcome man?  What is the ape to man?  A laughingstock or established embarrassment.  And man shall be that to Übermensch: a laughingstock or painful embarrassment.  You have made your way from worm to man, and much in you is still worm.  Once you were apes, and even now, too, man is more ape than any ape...The Übermensch is the meaning of the earth.  Let your will say: the Übermensch shall be the meaning of the earth ... Man is a rope, tied between beast and Übermensch—a rope over an abyss ... what is great in man is that he is a bridge and not an end...

Amor fati and the eternal recurrence 

Nietzsche may have encountered the idea of the Eternal Recurrence in the works of Heinrich Heine, who speculated that one day a person would be born with the same thought-processes as himself, and that the same applied to every other individual. Although he admired Heine he never mentions him in connection with this idea. Nietzsche put forth his theory in The Gay Science and developed in Thus Spoke Zarathustra. Schopenhauer directly influenced this theory. Schopenhauer postulated that a person who unconditionally affirms life would do so even if everything that has happened were to happen again repeatedly.

Nietzsche's view on eternal return is similar to that of Hume: "the idea that an eternal recurrence of blind, meaningless variation—chaotic, pointless shuffling of matter and law—would inevitably spew up worlds whose evolution through time would yield the apparently meaningful stories of our lives. This idea of eternal recurrence became a cornerstone of his nihilism, and thus part of the foundation of what became existentialism." It is unclear whether Nietzsche viewed his idea as a scientific hypothesis or just a though-experiment whose purpose is to test individual's affirmation of life. He had an interest in natural sciences and read about related topics in cosmology and thermodynamics, but most of his scientific arguments remained unpublished. According to Lou Salome, who is considered an unreliable source, Nietzsche had plans to study natural sciences in Vienna or Paris in order to prove his idea. "Nietzsche viewed his argument for eternal recurrence as a proof of the absurdity or meaninglessness of life, a proof that no meaning was given to the universe from on high."

What if a demon were to creep after you one day or night, in your loneliest loneness, and say: "This life which you live and have lived, must be lived again by you, and innumerable times more. And mere will be nothing new in it, but every pain and every joy and every thought and every sigh—everything unspeakably small and great in your life—must come again to you, and in the same sequence and series ... The eternal hourglass will again and again be turned—and you with it, dust of dust!" Would you not throw yourself down and curse the demon who spoke to you thus? Or have you once experienced a tremendous moment, in which you would answer him: "Thou art a god, and never have I heard anything more divine!" [The Gay Science (1882), p. 341 (passage translated in Danto 1965, p. 210).]

Nietzsche's place in contemporary ethical theory 

Nietzsche's work addresses ethics from several perspectives: meta-ethics, normative ethics, and descriptive ethics.

In the field of meta-ethics, one can perhaps most accurately classify Nietzsche as a moral skeptic; meaning that he claims that all ethical statements are false, because any kind of correspondence between ethical statements and "moral facts" remains illusory. (This forms part of a more general claim that no universally true fact exists, roughly because none of them more than "appear" to correspond to reality). Instead, ethical statements (like all statements) remain mere "interpretations." However, Nietzsche does not claim that all interpretations are equivalent, since some testify for "noble" character while others are the symptom of a "decadent" life-form.

Sometimes Nietzsche may seem to have very definite opinions on what he regards as moral or as immoral. Note, however, that one can explain Nietzsche's moral opinions without attributing to him the claim of their truth. For Nietzsche, after all, we need not disregard a statement merely because it expresses something false. On the contrary, he depicts falsehood as essential for "life". He mentions a "dishonest lie", (discussing Wagner in The Case of Wagner) as opposed to an "honest" one, recommending further to consult Plato with regard to the latter, which should give some idea of the layers of paradox in his work.

In the juncture between normative ethics and descriptive ethics, Nietzsche distinguishes between "master morality" and "slave morality". He recognizes that not everyone holds either scheme in a clearly delineated fashion without some syncretism, he presents them in contrast to one another. Some of the contrasts in master vs. slave morality include:

 "good" and "bad" interpretations vs. "good" and "evil" interpretations
 "aristocratic" vs. "part of the 'herd'"
 determines values independently of predetermined foundations (nature) vs. determines values on predetermined, unquestioned foundations (Christianity).

Nietzsche elaborated these ideas in his book On the Genealogy of Morality, in which he also introduced the key concept of ressentiment as the basis for the slave morality.  Nietzsche's primarily negative assessment of the ethical and moralistic teachings of Christianity followed from his earlier considerations of the questions of God and morality in the works The Gay Science and Thus Spoke Zarathustra. These considerations led Nietzsche to the idea of eternal recurrence. Nietzsche primarily meant that, for all practical purposes, his contemporaries lived as if God were dead, though they had not yet recognized it. Nietzsche believed this "death" had already started to undermine the foundations of morality and would lead to moral relativism and moral nihilism. As a response to the dangers of these trends he believed in re-evaluating the foundations of morality to better understand the origins and motives underlying them, so that individuals might decide for themselves whether to regard a moral value as born of an outdated or misguided cultural imposition or as something they wish to hold true.

Social and political views 
Nietzsche's political ideas were variously interpreted as aristocratic radicalism, Bonapartism, individualist anarchism, and more controversially as proto-fascism (see: Nietzsche and fascism) with some authors describing him as apolitical, anti-political or political sceptic. Today two positions have dominated the literature: one attributes to Nietzsche a commitment to aristocratic forms of social ordering, while the other denies that Nietzsche has any political philosophy at all. Walter Kaufmann put forward the view that the powerful individualism expressed in his writings would be disastrous if introduced to the public realm of politics. Georges Bataille argued in 1937, in the Acéphale review, that Nietzsche's thoughts were too free to be instrumentalized by any political movement. In "Nietzsche and Fascists," he argued against such instrumentalization, by the left or the right, declaring that Nietzsche's aim was to by-pass the short timespan of modern politics, and its inherent lies and simplifications, for a greater historical timespan.

Much of Nietzsche's contempt of politics is directed towards modern democratic, parliamentarian, party politics and especially mass movements such as socialism and antisemitic populism.  He contrasted such mundane, petty politics with his idea of "great politics", and often praised individual politicians such as Napoleon.  He interpreted Napoleon as an autocratic genius who stood above conventional morality, invalidated the French revolution, restored colonial slavery, and tried to revive the aristocratic spirit of Roman Empire, paganism and Renaissance, and not as a progressive revolutionary leader like some of his contemporaries.  Despite his proclaimed contempt for daily politics and culture of newspaper reading, which was a common attitude of conservatives who saw the mass publishing as subversive, Nietzsche did comment on contemporary political events in his letters and notes.  He was deeply disturbed by the Paris Commune, he initially supported Bismarck but became disappointed by his later social policies and détente toward socialists and Catholics, he was worried about the rise of Adolf Stoecker, and after death of Emperor Friedrich III he became worried about the future of free speech in Germany.

He was against equality of rights and defended slavery, believing that it is a necessary condition for supporting an upper class which could devote itself to more sophisticated activities. In his letters and personal notes he ridiculed American abolitionists such as Harriet Beecher Stowe, and wrote disparagingly of German attempts, led by the Kaiser and Christian activists, to end slavery in colonial Africa (leading to Brussels Conference Act of 1890). Nietzsche claimed that the upper classes are overreacting and projecting their own sensitivity to the suffering of slaves and poor industrial workers who are supposedly toughened by hardship, less sensitive to pain and contended with their life. However, while he wrote positively about ancient and colonial slavery, he did not leave any clear comments suggesting that he actually advocated reintroduction of slavery in modern Europe. In fact, he proposed that the rebellious European workers could be pacified by shifting some of their burden to Asian and African populations. He saw the contemporary revolutionary and emancipatory movements as the most recent part of the long-term social and cultural decay as he noted:
Continuation of Christianity by the French Revolution. Rousseau is the seducer: he again removes the chains of woman, who from then on is represented in an ever more interesting way, as suffering. Then the slaves and Mistress Beecher-Stowe. Then the poor and the workers. Then the vicious and the sick — all that is brought to the fore.
Nietzsche extoled aristocratic societies and military elites claiming that they create higher quality of culture.  He often linked noble classes with ancient barbarian conquerors. His thoughts were usually oriented to the future aristocracy, not so much to the preservation of existing monarchical order, which he saw as exhausted and thing of the past. He saw the last expression of noble values, French seventeenth and eighteenth century, lost after the fall of Napoleon. Much of his thoughts on the subject are unsystematic and he did not leave specific instructions about how this new aristocratic class should be selected and elevated to the ruling positions in society. However, he was quite clear that he used the term "aristocracy" in the traditional sense, meaning noble birth and hereditary hierarchy; he ridiculed the idea of "aristocracy of the spirit" popular among intellectuals as a democratic subversion. The term "aristocratic radicalism" was first used by Georg Brandes to which Nietzsche responded:
The expression Aristocratic Radicalism, which you employ, is very good. It is... the cleverest thing I have yet read about myself. How far this mode of thought has carried me already, how far it will carry me yet – I am almost afraid to imagine.
In the context of his criticism of morality and Christianity, expressed, among others works, in On the Genealogy of Morals and in The Antichrist, Nietzsche often criticized humanitarian feelings, detesting how pity and altruism were ways for the "weak" to take power over the "strong". To the "ethics of compassion" (Mitleid, "shared suffering") exposed by Schopenhauer, Nietzsche opposed an "ethics of friendship" or of "shared joy" (Mitfreude).

Individualism and liberalism 
Nietzsche often referred to the common people who participated in mass movements and shared a common mass psychology as "the rabble", or "the herd". Although he valued individualism his general political views included many hierarchical and authoritarian ideas which are usually incompatible with modern individualistic ideologies.  He often used the term "individualism" to describe a certain set of personality traits - such as originality, nonconformism and egoism - not to describe the political system based on institutions that guarantee wide individual rights and freedoms. According to Nietzsche, who often held pre-Socratic Greece and ancient Rome as the social model, individualism and freedom should be reserved only for the aristocratic minority, while discouraged among the subjugated masses who don’t have the natural capacity for it. Such freedom is not given to all people as a natural right but is earned by the strong individual through struggle, and is closely connected to the power that he can exercise over others. Arguably, such elitist individualism can be interpreted as similar to early liberalism since many authors and politicians at the time supported stratified society with low social mobility, racial exclusion, colonial conquests and even slavery. It is also comparable with conservative, aristocratic liberalism of Alexis de Tocqueville, Hippolyte Taine, Jacob Burckhardt (Nietzsche corresponded with the latter two) although his overall philosophy is much more radical.

In his opposition to Christian tradition and modern philosophy Nietzsche also criticized the concepts of soul, subject and atomism (that is, the existence of an atomic subject at the foundation of everything, found for example in social contract theories). He considered the individual subject as a complex of instincts and wills-to-power, just as any other organization. He claimed that idea of subject, whether in metaphysical or scientific sense, leads to the belief in essential equality of people and is politically used to justify notion of human rights, therefore calling René Descartes the "grandfather of French revolution".

Beginning in the 1890s some scholars have attempted to link his philosophy with Max Stirner's radical individualism of The Ego and Its Own (1844). The question remained pendent. Recently there was unearthed further, still circumstantial, evidence clarifying his relationship with Stirner. In any case, few philosophers really consider Nietzsche an "individualist" thinker. Against the strictly "egoist" perspective adopted by Stirner, Nietzsche concerned himself with the "problem of the civilization" and the necessity to give humanity a goal and a direction to its history, making him, in this sense, a very political thinker.  In The Will to Power he described individualism as a part of the process that leads to the ultimate goal of establishing the order of rank:
Individualism is a modest and still unconscious form of will to power; with it a single human unit seems to think it sufficient to free himself from the preponderating power of society (or of the State or Church). He does not set himself up in opposition as a personality, but merely as a unit; he represents the rights of all other individuals as against the whole. That is to say, he instinctively places himself on a level with every other unit: what he combats he does not combat as a person, but as a representative of units against a mass. (...)  When one has reached a certain degree of independence, one always longs for more: separation in proportion to the degree of force; the individual is no longer content to regard himself as equal to everybody, he actually seeks for his peer—he makes himself stand out from others. Individualism is followed by a development in groups and organs; correlative tendencies join up together and become powerfully active: now there arise between these centres of power, friction, war, a reconnoitring of the forces on either side, reciprocity, understandings, and the regulation of mutual services. Finally, there appears an order of rank.
While Nietzsche shared some of the liberal ideas and values such as individualism, private property, economic inequality, suspicion of state power, and dismissed political criticisms of exploitation his philosophy does not have much in common with classical liberalism and capitalism. He wrote that liberalism is synonymous with mediocrity and believed also that it leads to cultural decay. He also decried "liberal optimism" of political economy, the idea that economic development and technological innovation should solve social problems; even though it was more attainable and moderate than socialist utopianism, he still saw the goal of mass happiness and comfort as unworthy and philistine. He dismissed captains of the industry as vulgar and even blamed them for the rise of socialism, claiming that rise of the capitalist class disrupted the order of rank and that workers would not rebel if they were able to serve the true, natural aristocrats instead of capitalists whom they do not see as superiors but just as ordinary people who got lucky with money.  Bourgeoisie, with its love of practical work and educational, intellectual specialization, is unable to create aristocratic culture of leisure and sophistication. He praised Napoleon for reviving the warlike, aristocratic spirit which triumphed over the "modern ideas", over "the businessman and the philistine". His attitudes were particularly negative in his earlier works. He claimed that luxurious goods should be heavily taxed  and that economy should be regulated so that people cannot get rich quickly by means of financial speculation.  In Human, All Too Human, the work of his middle period, he wrote that "youthful Jew of the stock exchange is the most repugnant invention of the whole human race". However, he later significantly changed his attitude and noted that Jewish financiers should play a prominent role in the new united Europe. In his later writings he even particularly praised Jewish capitalists as powerful, natural allies against Christianity, socialism and nationalism. 

According to Domenico Losurdo, in his later works Nietzsche concluded that the industrial society which he disliked is here to stay and the return to warlike, landed aristocracy is unrealistic. He also developed some sympathies to the diligent, competent bourgeoisie, seeing the wealthy capitalist class as necessary allies in the struggle against both Adolf Stoecker's Christian movement and social democracy which were gaining influence in Germany. To solve the conflict he hesitantly accepted the idea that aristocracy should absorb the emerging capitalist class while retaining the cultural supremacy. Even the vulgar commercial activities could be transformed by the aristocracy in a similar way that hunting was raised from practical subsistence into a ceremonial, luxurious activity. Don Dombowsky argues that Nietzsche’s criticisms of capitalism are mostly cultural and moderate; compared with the usual ideological points of political economy and views on class conflict, he is still consistently aligned with the capital against the worker movement which he saw as a fundamental threat to his hierarchical vision of society.  William Altman also interprets Nietzsche’s criticism of capitalist class as the advice to cultivate better public image and thus legitimize the social hierarchy.

Criticism of socialism and labour movement 
Negative attitude towards socialism and proletarian movement was one of the most consistent themes in Nietzsche's philosophy.  He wrote negatively of socialism as early as 1862 and his criticisms of socialism are often harsher than those of other doctrines. He was critical of French revolution and was deeply disturbed by the Paris Commune which he saw as a destructive insurrection of the vulgar lower classes that made him feel "annihilated for several days".  In his later writings he especially praised contemporary French authors, most of whom were right-wing thinkers whose works expressed strongly negative response to the Commune and its political heritage.  As opposed to the urban working class, Nietzsche praised the peasantry as an example of health and natural nobility. Beyond only abstract, cultural opposition, he regularly wrote against specific social policies of the German Empire that aimed to improve the position and welfare of the workers. He was particularly against democratic, universal education, calling it "barbarism" and "a prelude to communism" because it pointlessly arouses the masses who are "born to serve and obey".

He called socialism "the tyranny of the meanest and the dumbest"  and claimed that it attracts inferior people who are motivated by ressentiment.  A lot of his criticism is linked to his view of Christianity; he called socialism "residue of Christianity and of Rousseau in the de-Christianised world". He described Rousseau as "moral tarantula", his ideas as "idiocies and half-truths" that were born out of self-contempt and inflamed vanity, claimed that he held a grudge against the ruling classes and by moralizing he tried to blame them for his own misery.  He named him together with Savonarola, Martin Luther, Robespierre and Saint-Simon as fanatics, "sick intellects" who influence masses and stand in opposition to strong spirits.  He similarly called Eugen Dühring an "apostle of revenge", "moral braggart" and his ideas "indecent and revolting moralistic gibberish". He saw egalitarian and peaceful socialist community as essentially antagonistic to life; in On the Genealogy of Morality he wrote:
A legal system conceived of as sovereign and universal, not as a means in the struggle of power complexes, but as a means against all struggles in general, something along the lines of Dühring's communist cliché in which each will must be considered as equal to every will, that would be a principle hostile to life, a destroyer and dissolver of human beings, an assassination attempt on the future of human beings, a sign of exhaustion, a secret path to nothingness.
Nietzsche believed that if socialist goals are achieved society would be leveled down and conditions for superior individuals and higher culture would disappear. In Twilight of the Idols  he wrote: 
‘Equality’, a certain definite process of making everybody uniform, which only finds its expression in the theory of equal rights, is essentially bound up with a declining culture: the chasm between man and man, class and class, the multiplicity of types, the will to be one’s self and to distinguish one’s self – that, in fact, which I call the pathos of distance is proper to all strong ages.
Unlike many conservative and liberal authors of the era Nietzsche didn’t justify the dismal conditions of the working class purely as an unfortunate price that had to be paid for the leisured, cultured lifestyle of the upper-class minority, but saw them as an expression of natural, caste order which is necessary for both the rich and the poor. He claimed that even if reduction of work and granting more leisure to the masses were economically feasible they would have a negative social, cultural effect because people of common nature are incapable of enjoying aristocratic idleness. Highest society imagined by socialists would be lowest according to his order of rank. In The Antichrist he wrote:
Whom do I hate most heartily among the rabbles of today? The rabble of Socialists, the apostles to the Chandala, who undermine the workingman's instincts, his pleasure, his feeling of contentment with his petty existence—who make him envious and teach him revenge.... Wrong never lies in unequal rights; it lies in the assertion of "equal" rights.... What is bad? But I have already answered: all that proceeds from weakness, from envy, from revenge. — The anarchist and the Christian have the same ancestry....
In The Will to Power he further elaborated similarity between Christianity and socialism:
The Gospel is the announcement that the road to happiness lies open for the lowly and the poor—that all one has to do is to emancipate one's self from all institutions, traditions, and the tutelage of the higher classes. Thus Christianity is no more than the typical teaching of Socialists. Property, acquisitions, mother-country, status and rank, tribunals, the police, the State, the Church, Education, Art, militarism: all these are so many obstacles in the way of happiness, so many mistakes, snares, and devil's artifices, on which the Gospel passes sentence—all this is typical of socialistic doctrines. Behind all this there is the outburst, the explosion, of a concentrated loathing of the "masters,"—the instinct which discerns the happiness of freedom after such long oppression.... (Mostly a symptom of the fact that the inferior classes have been treated too humanely, that their tongues already taste a joy which is forbidden them.... It is not hunger that provokes revolutions, but the fact that the mob have contracted an appetite en mangeant....) 
Nietzsche never mentioned Karl Marx or Friedrich Engels by name, and it is unclear whether he was acquainted with their ideas.  However, they are more or less extensively quoted and discussed in eleven books that Nietzsche owned in his personal library and in one of them he underlined Marx's name.  In socialist countries Nietzsche was usually considered a disreputable reactionary, burgeois, imperialist or fascist philosopher.  His books were unavailable to the public in the Soviet Union since 1923. They were placed on the list of forbidden books and were kept in libraries only for restricted, authorized use.  Until 1988 they were not translated or reprinted, and in the years between 1938 and 1988 only ten dissertations on Nietzsche were defended. Western Leftist writers, led by French postwar intellectuals, largely rehabilitated Nietzsche on the Left and have proposed ways of using Nietzschean theory in what has become known as the "politics of difference" — particularly in formulating theories of political resistance and sexual and moral difference.

Race, class and eugenics 
Nietzsche often made racist, classist remarks and used racialist explanations of cultural and political phenomena.  Some of his later admirers often tried to reinterpret, downplay or ignore this part of his thought, but because of preponderance of explicit comments in Nietzsche's work, such approach remains controversial.  There are also controversies about some newer translations of Nietzsche which seem to be misleadingly euphemistic when dealing with more loaded terms that Nietzsche used.  Nietzsche used the term race in two different meanings, for ethnic groups and social classes.

He believed that race and class are identical in the sense that nations are composed of different races and that upper classes are usually of superior nature to the lower.  He was fascinated by the restrictive caste system of India and Laws of Manu which he saw as promoting eugenics.  Such ideas about aristocracy and race were especially popularized in 19th century by Arthur de Gobineau.  It is unclear whether Nietzsche was directly influenced by Gobineau but he was probably aware of his work because of numerous similarities and because Richard Wagner was an admirer who wrote an introductory essay on his work. Excerpts from Gobineau were frequently published in the Wagnerian journal Bayreuther Blätter which Nietzsche read.  

Despite his opposition to Darwinism, he was very interested in the works of Francis Galton, although he had only partial knowledge of his works since they were not translated. Like Nietzsche, Galton also praised ancient Greeks claiming that their customs, partially unconsciously, promoted eugenic outcomes and population control. Nietzsche admired the Megaran poet Theognis who rallied against marriages between the aristocracy and common people. He proposed numerous eugenic policies such as medical examinations before marriage, discouragement of celibacy among successful and healthy individuals, tax breaks, and also castration of criminals and mentally ill. Along with his opposition to Darwinism, he also disagreed with Social Darwinism, especially Herbert Spencer’s ideas of progress, but Nietzsche’s views on welfare policies, social conflict and inequality are not much different from the ones usually held by Social Darwinists. He didn't share the evolutionary optimism of the Darwinists, believing that current trends in European society point to degeneration of the species rather than to survival of the fittest. Some of his views were influenced by the works of Charles Féré and Théodule-Armand Ribot.

One of the themes that Nietzsche often used to explain social phenomena was mixing of the races.  He believed that mixed race persons were usually inferior because of the conflicting, incompatible instincts that exist in them, and advocated racial purification.  He used Socrates as a negative example of miscegenation, although he claimed that it can also occasionally create energetic individuals such as Alcibiades and Caesar. He blamed the mixing of the races on the decay of the European society and culture, but also credited it with the creation of modern men of the "historical sense."

He also used the term race in the ethnic meaning and in this sense he supported the idea of mixing specific races which he considered to be of high quality (for example he proposed that Germans should mix with Slavs).  Despite occasional reverence for ancient Germanic conquests and his identification of upper class with blond, dolichocephalic type, Nietzsche's ideas do not have much in common with Nordicism.  He occasionally also praised non-European cultures, such as Moors, Incas and Aztecs, claiming that they were superior to their European conquerors.  In The Dawn of Day he also proposed mass immigration of Chinese to Europe claiming that they would bring "modes of living and thinking, which would be found very suitable for industrious ants" and help "imbue this fretful and restless Europe with some of their Asiatic calmness and contemplation, and—what is perhaps most needful of all—their Asiatic stability." While Nietzsche’s thoughts on the subject are often vague, he did occasionally use very harsh language, calling for "the annihilation of the decadent races" and "millions of deformed".

Jews, nationalism and European identity

Nietzsche made numerous comments on Jews and Judaism, both positive and negative, and his attitudes changed significantly during his life, from fairly common anti-Semitic prejudices to more complex and specific perspective. There are also controversies about translations of his work which sometimes try to tone down his more inflammatory remarks or disguise some of the anti-Semitic stereotypes that he used.

He blamed Judaism for spreading the idea of monotheism which puts a perfect God so high above humans that they all seem small before him and essentially equal among themselves. But he also praised parts of the Old Testament and early Jewish history. He claimed that Judaism went through a negative, moralistic-pessimistic transformation during the Babylonian captivity. By losing their native aristocratic class, subjugated Jews, now composed only of the priestly caste and the Chandala, became resentful toward their foreign masters and generalized such feelings into a religious ressentiment of any type of aristocracy, thus inventing the Master–slave morality. Christianity was further, even more radical development of the same idea that went to undermine the aristocratic Roman Empire - and was later followed by Protestant Reformation and French revolution. Although Nietzsche didn’t put blame on cultural decay exclusively on Jews, like some biological anti-Semites, he did note their decisive historical influence. Nietzsche even claimed that anti-Semites are also the product of Jewish spirit, since with their Christian, populist and socialist ideas, they exhibit the same slave morality and ressentiment that were historically pioneered by the Jews.  In that sense his negative attitude towards the Jews goes even further than the usual anti-Semitism of his era. He also held many common stereotypes about Jews being physically inferior, shrewd, egotistical, exploitative, dishonest and manipulative, although he didn’t necessarily consider all these characteristics negative.

He also often praised Jewish intelligence and achievements. He had a very negative attitude toward contemporary anti-Semitic movements, which were usually based on Christian, nationalist and economic animosity towards Jews. In Germany the anti-Semitic movement at the time was closely connected to the Christian socialism of Adolf Stoecker. Domenico Losurdo describes Nietzsche as being primarily against such populist, economic antisemitism, seeing it as motivated purely by resentment of Jewish success and money. In a letter he wrote that "anti-Semitism appears to be exactly like the struggle against the rich and the means previously employed to become rich". He praised old, wealthy Jewish families as a sort of refined Jewish aristocracy, seeing them as allies in the fight against socialism, while remaining scornful towards the masses of Jewish workers, artisans and merchants, who were often poor immigrants from Eastern Europe, perceived as uncouth and politically subversive. His most negative comments are directed against Jewish prophets and priests due to their historical influence on the West; he saw the leftist intellectuals as their modern version. Regarding the wealthy Jewish financiers he even proposed assimilationist policy of eugenic marriages with Prussian nobility.

Nietzsche broke with his editor in 1886 because of his opposition to his editor's anti-Semitic stances, and his rupture with Richard Wagner, expressed in The Case of Wagner and Nietzsche contra Wagner, both of which he wrote in 1888, had much to do with Wagner's endorsement of pan-Germanism and anti-Semitism — and also of his rallying to Christianity. In a March 29, 1887 letter to Theodor Fritsch, Nietzsche mocked anti-Semites, Fritsch, Eugen Dühring, Wagner, Ebrard, Wahrmund, and the leading advocate of pan-Germanism, Paul de Lagarde, who would become, along with Wagner and Houston Chamberlain, the main official influences of Nazism. This 1887 letter to Fritsch ended by: "And finally, how do you think I feel when the name Zarathustra is mouthed by anti-Semites?" He admitted that his Thus Spoke Zarathustra was read and positively reviewed almost only by Wagnerians and anti-Semites who also unsuccessfully tried to win him to their cause.

Nietzsche heavily criticized his sister and her husband, Bernhard Förster, speaking harshly against the "anti-Semitic canaille":
I've seen proof, black on white, that Herr Dr. Förster has not yet severed his connection with the anti-Semitic movement ... Since then I've had difficulty coming up with any of the tenderness and protectiveness I've so long felt toward you. The separation between us is thereby decided in really the most absurd way. Have you grasped nothing of the reason why I am in the world? ... Now it has gone so far that I have to defend myself hand and foot against people who confuse me with these anti-Semitic canaille; after my own sister, my former sister, and after Widemann more recently have given the impetus to this most dire of all confusions. After I read the name Zarathustra in the anti-Semitic Correspondence my forbearance came to an end. I am now in a position of emergency defense against your spouse's Party. These accursed anti-Semite deformities shall not sully my ideal!!
Draft for a letter to his sister Elisabeth Förster-Nietzsche (December 1887)

Nietzsche became very critical of pan-Germanism and nationalism after the Prussian victory over France.  Although he participated in the war as a volunteer, he soon became disillusioned by the new German Empire, seeing the subsequent development in German culture as vulgar and triumphalist.  Instead he praised European identity and integration, predicting that developments in trade, industry and internal migrations will weaken the nations and result in a mixed European race and a unified continent that will play a more dominant role in the world politics. He deeply disliked Hohenzollern dynasty, especially due to their social policies accommodative toward the working class. In Ecce Homo (1888), Nietzsche criticized the "German nation" and its "will to power (to Empire, to Reich)", thus underscoring an easy misinterpretation of the Wille zur Macht, the conception of Germans as a "race", and the "anti-Semitic way of writing history", or of making "history conform to the German Empire", and stigmatized "nationalism, this national neurosis from which Europe is sick", this "small politics". Later in his life he even started to identify as Polish, believing that his ancestors were Polish noblemen who migrated to Germany (both his Polish and aristocratic ancestry claims are usually rejected by biographers; see: Citizenship, nationality and ethnicity). Nietzsche's cosmopolitan proclamations are not without its detractors who point out that he retained a lifelong focus on German society and culture, with his last writings before insanity being about German politics. His hostile and mocking attitude towards Germany is sometimes also traced to his personal frustrations, the break-up of his friendship with Wagner and the very poor reception of his work in Germany. 

Nietzsche had a positive view of Slavic people, but expressed mixed attitudes towards Russian Empire, describing it in his earlier works as a hostile Asian power, while later praising the Tsarist autocracy, the opposition towards the modernity, and the positive reception of his works in the aristocratic circles in Saint Petersburg. In Ecce Homo he particularly praised French culture as superior to all others, especially German. However, his negative attitudes and national criticisms were not reserved only for Germany. In his last years he made negative comments on cultural trends in French society and denounced many leading intellectuals of the era such as Hugo, Sand, Zola, Goncourt brothers, Sainte-Beuve, Baudelaire, Comte and Renan. His most consistently negative attitudes were towards England, which he described as nation of shopkeepers, philistines, moral hypocrites and puritanical Christians. Disregarding the British colonial pre-eminence and the ability to escape revolutionary upheavals of the Continent, which were often admired among reactionary aristocratic authors of the era, Nietzsche’s ire was mostly driven by British philosophical traditions which he denounced as utilitarian, altruistic, focused on lowly, plebeian goals of comfort and happiness. He held the same negative attitude toward the United States.

Nietzsche was an advocate of European colonialism, seeing it as a way to solve the overpopulation problem, pacify the rebellious working class, and rejuvenate the decadent European culture. European expansion and global domination were part of his great politics. He noted than in colonies Europeans often act as ruthless conquerors, unconstrained by the Christian morality and democratic values, which he saw as a liberated, healthy instinct. He had even shown some initial interest for his brother-in-law’s colonial project in Paraguay, Nueva Germania, despite the huge political differences between them, and for a while in mid 1880s also considered migrating to a Swiss colony in Oaxaca, Mexico. He was especially interested in climate differences, believing that Northern Europe is an unhealthy habitat which stunts cultural development; similar ideas, often very radical and unrealistic, were also held by Wagner and many of his followers. 

Nietzsche titled aphorism 377 in the fifth book of The Gay Science (published in 1887) "We who are homeless" (Wir Heimatlosen), in which he criticized pan-Germanism and patriotism and called himself a "good European". In the second part of this aphorism, which according to Georges Bataille contained the most important parts of Nietzsche's political thought, the thinker of the Eternal Return stated:
No, we do not love humanity; but on the other hand we are not nearly "German" enough, in the sense in which the word "German" is constantly being used nowadays, to advocate nationalism and race hatred and to be able to take pleasure in the national scabies of the heart and blood poisoning that now leads the nations of Europe to delimit and barricade themselves against each other as if it were a matter of quarantine. For that we are too open-minded, too malicious, too spoiled, also too well-informed, too "traveled": we far prefer to live on mountains, apart, "untimely", in past or future centuries, merely in order to keep ourselves from experiencing the silent rage to which we know we should be condemned as eyewitnesses of politics that are desolating the German spirit by making it vain and that is, moreover, petty politics:—to keep its own creation from immediately falling apart again, is it not finding it necessary to plant it between two deadly hatreds? must it not desire the eternalization of the European system of a lot of petty states? ... We who are homeless are too manifold and mixed racially and in our descent, being "modern men", and consequently do not feel tempted to participate in the mendacious racial self-admiration and racial indecency that parades in Germany today as a sign of a German way of thinking and that is doubly false and obscene among the people of the "historical sense". We are, in one word—and let this be our word of honor!— good Europeans, the heirs of Europe, the rich, oversupplied, but also overly obligated heirs of thousands of years of European spirit: as such, we have also outgrown Christianity and are averse to it, and precisely because we have grown out of it, because our ancestors were Christians who in their Christianity were uncompromisingly upright; for their faith they willingly sacrificed possessions and position, blood and fatherland. We—do the same. For what? For our unbelief? For every kind of unbelief? No, you know better than that, my friends! The hidden Yes in you is stronger than all Nos and Maybes that afflict you and your age like a disease; and when you have to embark on the sea, you emigrants, you, too, are compelled to this by— a faith! ...

Bataille was one of the first to denounce the deliberate misinterpretation of Nietzsche carried out by Nazis, among them Alfred Baeumler. In January 1937 he dedicated an issue of Acéphale, titled "Reparations to Nietzsche", to the theme "Nietzsche and the Fascists." There, he called Elisabeth Förster-Nietzsche "Elisabeth Judas-Förster," recalling Nietzsche's declaration: "To never frequent anyone who is involved in this bare-faced fraud concerning races." Domenico Losurdo ridicules the idea that an "intellectually rather mediocre woman" managed to manipulate and derail interpretations of Nietzsche for decades and inspire political movements encompassing millions of people. He dismisses such idea as unsustainable conspiracy theory noting that "there is no shortage of unsettling and horrific passages in Nietzsche’s writings". Due to his complex views and occasionally contradictory comments on these matters, the idea of Nietzsche as a predecessor to Nazism and fascism remains controversial and debated among scholars (see: Nietzsche and fascism).  Owing largely to the writings of Walter Kaufmann and French postwar philosophers, Nietzsche's reputation improved and today he usually is not linked to Nazism as he was in the past. Detractors note that authors such as Houston Stewart Chamberlain and Arthur de Gobineau also had complex views on matters of politics, nation and race that were incompatible with Nazi ideology on numerous points, but their influence on the Third Reich is still not dismissed as a misunderstanding.

War and military values 
Nietzsche made numerous comments in which he denounces pacifism, praises war, military values and conquests.  Some of them could be read as metaphoric, but in others he quite explicitly refers to specific policies or military actions and commanders.  Although he volunteered for the Franco-Prussian war, he soon became critical of Prussian militarism, mostly because of his disillusionment in German culture and national politics, but didn't renounce militarism in general.  He praised Napoleon for reviving the military spirit which he saw as defense against the decadent rule of "modern ideas", "businessmen and philistines".  In The Will to Power he further elaborated: 
When the instincts of a society ultimately make it give up war and renounce conquest, it is decadent: it is ripe for democracy and the rule of shopkeepers. In the majority of cases, it is true, assurances of peace are merely stupefying draughts.
He opposed the "rule of mandarins", solving conflicts by arbitration instead of war, and encouraged the military development of Europe. He proposed conscription, polytechnic military education and the idea that all men of higher classes should be reserve officers in addition to their civilian jobs.  In The Will to Power he wrote:
The maintenance of the military State is the last means of adhering to the great tradition of the past; or, where it has been lost, to revive it. By means of it the superior or strong type of man is preserved, and all institutions and ideas which perpetuate enmity and order of rank in States, such as national feeling, protective tariffs, etc., may on that account seem justified.
However, most of his praise is reserved for aristocratic "warriors" rather than common, plebeian "soldiers". He expressed some doubts about arming and training the conscripted proletarian masses, seeing them as a potential revolutionary threat. He also worried that modern wars among European nations might have dysgenic effect by sacrificing too many strong, brave individuals.

Views on women 

Nietzsche's views on women have served as a magnet for controversy, beginning during his life and continuing to the present. He frequently made remarks in his writing that some view as misogynistic.  He stated in Twilight of the Idols (1888) "Women are considered profound. Why? Because we never fathom their depths. But women aren't even shallow."

Relation to Schopenhauer
According to Santayana, Nietzsche considered his philosophy to be a correction of Schopenhauer's philosophy. In his Egotism in German Philosophy, Santayana listed Nietzsche's antithetical reactions to Schopenhauer:

These emendations show how Schopenhauer's philosophy was not a mere initial stimulus for Nietzsche, but formed the basis for much of Nietzsche's thinking.

Von Hartmann suggested that Schopenhauer was the only philosopher who has been systematically studied by Nietzsche.

Relation to Philipp Mainländer 

The work of Philipp Mainländer had an important impact on Nietzsche's intellectual development and made him distance himself from the philosophy of Schopenhauer. In Mainländer's 200 pages long criticism of Schopenhauer's philosophy, Mainländer argues against a metaphysical will behind the world, and argues instead for a real multiplicity of wills that struggle with each other.

Mainländer is perhaps best understood as a negative influence on Nietzsche. Mainländer took the pessimism of Schopenhauer to its ultimate conclusion and ended his own life. However, he did never recommend or argue for suicide – this is a common misconception – and aims to motivate those who abhor the world back to an active life with self-chosen goals. Mainländer is a hedonist and the goal of his ethics to indicate how man can reach the highest happiness. If life is worthless, then this must be used to attain a state of complete fearlessness.

Both Nietzsche and Mainländer owed their philosophical awakening to The World as Will and Representation, they disliked the popular successor of Schopenhauer, Eduard von Hartmann, both championed the individual and rejected traditional values, both proclaimed that God is dead (Mainländer had popularized the theme before Nietzsche). Their mental collapse has also drawn comparisons.

Relation to Søren Kierkegaard 
Nietzsche knew little of the 19th-century philosopher Søren Kierkegaard. Georg Brandes, a Danish philosopher, wrote to Nietzsche in 1888 asking him to study the works of Kierkegaard, to which Nietzsche replied that he would.

Recent research, however, suggests that Nietzsche was exposed to the works of Kierkegaard through secondary literature. Aside from Brandes, Nietzsche owned and read a copy of Hans Lassen Martensen's Christliche Ethik (1873) in which Martensen extensively quoted and wrote about Kierkegaard's individualism in ethics and religion. Nietzsche also read Harald Høffding's Psychologie in Umrissen auf Grundlage der Erfahrung (ed. 1887) which expounded and critiqued Kierkegaard's psychology.  Thomas Brobjer believes one of the works Nietzsche wrote about Kierkegaard is in Morgenröthe, which was partly written in response to Martensen's work.  In one of the passages, Nietzsche wrote: "Those moralists, on the other hand, who, following in the footsteps of Socrates, offer the individual a morality of self-control and temperance as a means to his own advantage, as his personal key to happiness, are the exceptions."  Brobjer believes Kierkegaard is one of "those moralists".

The first philosophical study comparing Kierkegaard and Nietzsche was published even before Nietzsche's death. More than 60 articles and 15 full-length studies have been published devoted entirely in comparing these two thinkers.

Legacy 

Perhaps Nietzsche's greatest philosophical legacy lies in his 20th century interpreters, among them Pierre Klossowski, Martin Heidegger, Georges Bataille, Leo Strauss, Alexandre Kojève, Michel Foucault, Gilles Deleuze (and Félix Guattari), Jacques Derrida and Albert Camus. Foucault's later writings, for example, adopt Nietzsche's genealogical method to develop anti-foundationalist theories of power that divide and fragment rather than unite politics (as evinced in the liberal tradition of political theory). The systematic institutionalisation of criminal delinquency, sexual identity and practice, and the mentally ill (to name but a few) are examples used by Foucault to demonstrate how knowledge or truth is inseparable from the institutions that formulate notions of legitimacy from "immoralities" such as homosexuality and the like (captured in the famous power-knowledge equation). Deleuze, arguably the foremost of Nietzsche's interpreters, used the much-maligned "will to power" thesis in tandem with Marxian notions of commodity surplus and Freudian ideas of desire to articulate concepts such the rhizome and other "outsides" to state power as traditionally conceived.

Certain recent Nietzschean interpretations have emphasized the more untimely and politically controversial aspects of Nietzsche's philosophy. Nietzschean commentator Keith Ansell Pearson has pointed out the absurd hypocrisy of modern egalitarian liberals, socialists, communists and anarchists claiming Nietzsche as a herald of their own left-wing politics: "The values Nietzsche wishes to subject to a revaluation are largely altruistic and egalitarian values such as pity, self-sacrifice, and equal rights. For Nietzsche, modern politics rests largely on a secular inheritance of Christian values (he interprets the socialist doctrine of equality in terms of a secularization of the Christian belief in the equality of all souls before God". Works such as Bruce Detwiler's Nietzsche and the Politics of Aristocratic Radicalism, Fredrick Appel's Nietzsche contra Democracy, and Domenico Losurdo's  challenge the prevalent liberal interpretive consensus on Nietzsche and assert that Nietzsche's elitism was not merely an aesthetic pose but an ideological attack on the widely held belief in equal rights of the modern West, locating Nietzsche in the conservative-revolutionary tradition.

See also
 North American Nietzsche Society
 Transcendental perspectivism

Notes

References

Further reading 

On Nietzsche's view on women, see Jacques Derrida, Spurs: Nietzsche's Styles, trans. Barbara Harlow (Chicago & London: University of Chicago Press, 1979).
On Nietzsche and biology, see Barbara Stiegler, Nietzsche et la biologie, PUF, 2001, .

External links 
 Nietzsche Source: Digital version of the German critical edition of the complete works / Digital facsimile edition of the entire Nietzsche estate 
The Nietzsche Channel (include letters, section on Nietzsche's library, etc.)
Journal of Nietzsche Studies
 Nietzsche Quotes Searchable database of Nietzsche quotations, with daily quotes
 Martin Heidegger and Nietzsche's Overman: Aphorisms on the Attack